Martine Aurdal (born 17 September 1978) is a Norwegian journalist and editor.

She was born in Oslo. A cand.mag. by education, she started her journalistic career in Ullern Avis/Akersposten and worked in NRK, Klassekampen, Aftenposten and Fett before being editor-in-chief of Ny Tid from 2006 to 2008. Since 2008 she has worked in Dagbladet, being one of their most profiled commentators.

She is married to Erling Fossen.

References

1978 births
Living people
Journalists from Oslo
Norwegian magazine editors
Dagbladet people
Norwegian women editors
Norwegian women writers
Women magazine editors